The 'Other' Love Story is India's first televised same-sex love story, broadcast as a web series consisting of 12 episodes. The plot, set in the late 1990s/early 2000s, involves two girls in an era when there were no cell phones or internet. The series is written and directed by Roopa Rao, and produced by Harini Daddala for JLT Films. The main characters are played by Shweta Gupta and Spoorthi Gumaste. The 'Other' Love Story premiered on 27 August 2016.

Cast
 Shweta Gupta as Aachal
 Spoorthi Gumaste as Aadya
 Roopa Rao as Aadya's friend

References

External links
 

2016 web series debuts
2010s LGBT-related drama television series
Indian drama web series
Lesbian-related television shows
Indian LGBT-related web series